Floored is the second studio album by American rock band Sugar Ray, released on June 24, 1997. It includes the hit song "Fly", and another moderately successful single, "RPM". Two versions of "Fly" appear on the album, one of them featuring reggae artist Super Cat. Floored is the first album to feature DJ Homicide as an official member whereas he was a guest musician in the previous album Lemonade and Brownies.

Recording
The pop rock single "Fly" originated late in the recording sessions. Prior to coming up with the song, the band feared Atlantic Records would drop them due to the underperformance of their 1995 debut Lemonade and Brownies. Early in the writing process of Floored, singer Mark McGrath pushed for the band to make more scream-oriented metal songs, but the other members preferred melody-driven music. Disagreements over the album's intended sound led to McGrath storming out of a practice session in New York City.

Bassist Murphy Karges has labelled the song "High Anxiety" as a "lab experiment." He recalls that it originated from McGrath and producer David Kahne, saying that Kahne "kind of took it under his wing to create this interesting weird song that had all these parts in it."

Around the time the record was being made, the band appeared in the comedy film Fathers' Day, which would be released within a month of Floored in 1997.

Musical style 
The album has been categorized as funk metal and nu metal. It features elements of heavy metal, funk, reggae, pop, punk, ska and hip hop. In their June 1997 review, the Los Angeles Times believed the album derived influence from Korn, Rage Against the Machine and the Vandals. In another article from 1999, the Los Angeles Times characterized this era of Sugar Ray as having a "harder edged punk-funk sound", and claimed it to be derivative of not only Rage Against the Machine but also the Red Hot Chili Peppers. Ron Hart of CMJ New Music Report considered their sound on this album to be "metallic funk" in December 1998, while Spin referred to their sound as punk-funk in November 1997. Geoffrey Hines of The Washington Post similarly noted the album's mixture of funk, punk and metal. In July 1997, he wrote that "Sugar Ray are young enough to have learned a few lessons from such fellow Southern California bands as the pop-punkers Green Day, the funk-rockers Fishbone and the ska-punkers Sublime", adding that the band "borrows ingredients from all three role models and then thickens the sound by playing everything with the cartoonish hyperbole and heavy-metal pummeling of Kiss." Billboard claimed in September 1997 that the song "Fly" was not representative of the rest of the album, saying "while the band has undoubtedly become tied to the track due to its widespread coverage, it is only one facet of Sugar Ray's musical persona."

Due to the massive amounts of strong language in the songs "Cash" and "American Pig", some copies of the album contain the "Parental Advisory" label. It contains the early label that can be peeled off the case. It is their last album to do so and their last heavy album before they moved toward a more pop friendly approach.

Touring and promotion
The band toured throughout 1997 and 1998 to support Floored. Sugar Ray performed at the Blockbuster Rockfest festival in Fort Worth, Texas on June 21, 1997, which was televised. The event also featured artists such as Bush, Counting Crows, Jewel and No Doubt. In July 1997, Sugar Ray performed at the annual Vans Warped Tour, playing alongside Limp Bizkit, who released their debut Three Dollar Bill, Y'all that same month. The album included a song called "Indigo Flow" which referenced Sugar Ray, as they were friends with the band. During late 1997, they toured America with 311 and Incubus, who at that point had not yet released their breakthrough single "Drive". Incubus were initially only meant to perform on the first leg of this tour, but the crowd response to them was so great that they stayed for the remainder of it.

Sugar Ray contributed the song "Rivers" to the Scream 2 soundtrack album, released on November 18, 1997. The song can also be heard in the credits of the film itself, released a month later. It was an ode to Weezer frontman Rivers Cuomo and written in the style of a Weezer song.

Reception

Floored received generally positive reviews and went to number 12 on the Billboard 200 on August 30, 1997. Floored song "Fly" was extremely popular, topping the Radio Songs chart (and spending 59 weeks on the chart),  the Pop Songs chart, and the Alternative Songs chart. In September 1997, 510,000 copies of Floored were sold. In December 1997, 1,200,000 copies of Floored were sold. In February 1998, Floored was certified 2× platinum by the Recording Industry Association of America for selling 2,000,000 copies in the United States.

Robert Christgau gave the album a B−, writing, "[Sugar Ray is] the nearest thing to a fresh young rock band the market or the 'underground' has kicked up this year." The Los Angeles Times wrote, "Sugar Ray has a knack for catchy borrowing and for hard-rock crunch colored by pop hooks and a deejay's deft scratch effects. The single 'Fly' is a perfect summer confection that's as irresistible as it is lightweight." AllMusic wrote that "Sugar Ray's second album, Floored, is a noticeable improvement from Lemonade and Brownies. The group's fusion of metal, funk, reggae, and rap is seamless and confident, partially because Sugar Ray now emphasize the groove, not the guitars. The group still has difficulty writing a consistent batch of songs, but its hooks are stronger than ever." The Washington Post state in their review that the band "are juvenile, politically incorrect and derivative but nonetheless boast an infectious energy and enthusiasm."

Legacy
Entertainment Weekly wrote in 1999 that the album made Sugar Ray "the 1997 Furbys of the MTV spring-break crowd." In 2013, Angelica Leichardt of OC Weekly criticized their change in direction following Floored, remarking "perhaps they should have stayed a funk-metal band, which is where their sound originated from, because anything would be better than the junk they put out [afterwards]." Music critic Stephen Thomas Erlewine had a more positive view of the band's later change in direction, saying "they not only abandoned funk-metal the second they had a hit with the breezy 'Fly', they ran with their newfound success, turning into the sunny, good-time summertime band that American pop radio desperately needed in the bleak, self-absorbed aftermath of grunge." The A.V. Club wrote negatively of the album on its 20th anniversary in 2017. They noted that it was released in the same two week stretch between late June and early July 1997 that also featured albums by artists such as Insane Clown Posse, Limp Bizkit and Smash Mouth, and argued that this was the worst two week stretch in music history.

Track listing

Personnel

Sugar Ray
Mark McGrath – lead vocals, rhythm guitar 
Rodney Sheppard – lead guitar, backing vocals
Murphy Karges – bass, backing vocals 
Stan Frazier – drums, percussion, guitar, programming, backing vocals 
Craig "DJ Homicide" Bullock – turntables, samples, programming, keyboards, backing vocals

Artwork
Alison Dyer – photography
Donald May & Larry Freemantle – art direction
Rob Eberhardt – album artwork for chrome renderings
Richard Newton – illustration

Additional musicians
David Kahne – additional programming, keyboards

Production
David Kahne – producer, engineer, mixing
Stephen Marcussen – mastering
Doug Trantow – mixing assistant 
James Murray – mixing assistant
Mark Nixdorf – mixing assistant  
Mike Rew – mixing assistant
John Ewing Jr. – assistant Engineer
John Travis – tracking engineer
Chip Quigley & Lee Heiman – management

Charts

Weekly charts

Year-end charts

References

1997 albums
Sugar Ray albums
Atlantic Records albums
Albums produced by David Kahne
Funk metal albums
Nu metal albums by American artists